Birmingham Archives and Heritage are a collection at the Library of Birmingham, and hold the archives for the city of Birmingham, England. The archives are held at Victoria Square, Birmingham, and run by Birmingham City Council. The records date back to the 12th century and are accessible for multiple levels of research, from family histories to a wider range of historical interest of the area.

Women's history records

The archives hold a number of specialist collections relating to women's history such as records relating to Suffragism in Birmingham, including records relating to Winson Green Prison where force feeding of women on hunger strike was first carried out. Also held are records relating to women's lives during the Second World War such as those of the female munitions workers at Birmingham Small Arms and John Lucas Ltd. Women's health is dealt with in a number of collections, such as the journal of T.A. Finigan, an Irish Priest, which deals with women of the Irish community in Birmingham, or the records of the Birmingham Association for the Unmarried Mother and Her Child (c.1906–1976).

References

External links
Birmingham Archives and Heritage website

Year of establishment missing
Archives in the West Midlands (county)
History of the West Midlands (county)
History of Birmingham, West Midlands
Culture in Birmingham, West Midlands
History of women in the United Kingdom